Tia Ciata, born Hilária Batista de Almeida (1854–1924) was a Brazilian cook, mãe-de-santo of Candomblé, and an influential figure in the development of samba. She was born in Santo Amaro, Bahia, and initiated in Candomblé in Salvador by Bangboshe Obitikô (Rodolfo Martins de Andrade). She was a devotee of deity Oshun and became the iyakekerê, or second most important leader, in the terreiro of João Alabá in Rio de Janeiro. "Ciata", the name by which she is now known, is a variant on the Arabic name Aycha; it was a common feminine name among the Muslim community from Portuguese Guinea that formerly resided in Rio de Janeiro.

Tia Ciata arrived in Rio de Janeiro in 1876 at the age of 22 and worked as a vendor at a food stall. She lived on Rua Visconde de Itauna in the neighborhood of Praça Onze (now Cidade Nova), an area which became known as "Pequena África", or Little Africa. It was here that Tia Ciata became one of the main progenitors of Afro-Brazilian culture of early favelas of Rio de Janeiro. Samba musicians, composers, and dancers regularly gathered in her home; her residence may be one of the birthplaces of the genre. Samba evolved in Ciata's back yard. Here you would find future giants of the genre including Pixinguinha, João da Baiana and Heitor dos Prazeres. Ciata's yard became a trendsetting cultural hub where new samba composers and songs could find popularity before the existence of radio in Brazil. The first samba recording, Pelo Telefone, a composition by Donga (Ernesto Joaquim Maria dos Santos) and Mauro de Almeida, was recorded in the residence. Like Tia Citata, the vocalist of Pelo Telefone was from Santo Amaro, Bahia. Police persecuted Black musicians and practitioners of Afro-Brazilian religions, despite the individual liberties promised by the 1891 constitution. Ciata grew smart at evading repression. A true samba party would necessarily require the presence of drums, which have always been negatively associated with the Afro-Brazilian religious cults. So Ciata would wisely place the samba musicians in the back yards, supposedly the most hidden and safest part of the house. In the entrance hall, the house's most visible and audible space, brass and string instrumentalists would be playing ‘choro’ music – considered more erudite, and hardly linked to anything close to ‘Black magic’. When the police came, Ciata would say she was hosting a choro gathering and things would normally be fine for the rest of the night. Ciata's parties gained legitimacy thanks to a chance encounter with the president. As a practitioner of the Afro-Brazilian religion of Candomblé, she was highly respected for her spiritual wisdom. When President Venceslau Brás (1914-1918) sought a cure for a long-term leg infection that no doctor could treat, an adviser recommended Ciata's herbal treatments.

She married João Batista da Silva, and had fourteen children. The couple became noted figures in Pequena África of Rio, and Tia Ciata was honored annually at the Rio Carnival until her death in Rio de Janeiro in 1924.

References

1854 births
1924 deaths
People from Bahia
People from Rio de Janeiro (city)
Samba
Brazilian Candomblés
Brazilian people of African descent
Afro-Brazilian people
Afro-Brazilian women
Brazilian Carnival
Rio Carnival